The 2010–11 Dayton Flyers men's basketball team represented the University of Dayton in the 2010–11 college basketball season. This was head coach Brian Gregory's eighth season at Dayton. The Flyers compete in the Atlantic 10 Conference and played their home games at the University of Dayton Arena. They finished the season 22–14, 7–9 in A-10 play and lost the championship game of the 2011 Atlantic 10 men's basketball tournament, which hurt their chances to get to the 2011 NCAA Men's Division I Basketball Tournament. Instead they were invited to the 2011 National Invitation Tournament which they lost in the first round.

Incoming recruits

Roster
Source

Schedule and results
Source
All times are Eastern

|-
!colspan=9| Exhibition

|-
!colspan=9| Regular Season

|-
!colspan=9| 2011 Atlantic 10 men's basketball tournament

|-
!colspan=9| 2011 National Invitation Tournament

References

Dayton
Dayton Flyers men's basketball seasons
Dayton
Dayton
Dayton